Doberan Kallan  is a Town and a union council of Kallar Syedan Tehsil in Rawalpindi District Punjab, Pakistan. Doberan Kallan Coms under Choha Khalsa Circle Union Councils Doberan Kallan was under NA-50, National Assembly and PP-2, Punjab Assembly. After (Delimitation 2018) Doberan Kallan came under NA-58, National Assembly and PP-7, Punjab Assembly.

Language
 Pothwari language: 99.1%
 Urdu .05%
 Pashto 0.3%
 Other 0.1%

Schools in Doberan Kalan
 Government Boys High School DOBERAN KALAN, DOBRIN KALAN, KALLAR SYEDAN

References 

Union councils of Kallar Syedan Tehsil
Populated places in Kallar Syedan Tehsil
Towns in Kallar Syedan Tehsil